Sim Woon-sub (a.k.a. Shim Un-seob; ; born 24 February 1990) is a South Korean professional footballer who currently plays as a midfielder for Hong Kong Premier League club Sham Shui Po.

Club career
After finishing university in South Korea in 2012, Sim was unable find a home with any Korean clubs. To start his professional career, he left Korea with 2 other players to find a club to sign with. Sim signed with Myanmar National League side Nay Pyi Taw.

In 2015, Sim joined Myanmar National League and signed a year-long contract with the local team Ayeyawady United. During his stay at the club, he made 33 appearances from the start out of 35 in which all of them he played full 90 minutes. He also played in 15 matches out of 16 in the 2015 AFC Cup.

On 20 May 2019, Ararat Yerevan announced that they had terminated Sim's contract by mutual consent.

On 11 January 2023, Sim joined Sham Shui Po.

Honours
Vissai Ninh Bình
 Vietnamese Super Cup : 2013

References

External links
Sim Woon-sub at footballmalaysia.com

1990 births
Living people
People from Gangneung
South Korean footballers
South Korean expatriate footballers
Expatriate footballers in Myanmar
Expatriate footballers in Vietnam
Expatriate footballers in Cambodia
Expatriate footballers in Malaysia
Expatriate footballers in Armenia
Expatriate footballers in Taiwan
Expatriate footballers in Hong Kong
South Korean expatriate sportspeople in Myanmar
South Korean expatriate sportspeople in Vietnam
South Korean expatriate sportspeople in Cambodia
South Korean expatriate sportspeople in Malaysia
South Korean expatriate sportspeople in Taiwan
South Korean expatriate sportspeople in Hong Kong
Myanmar National League players
V.League 1 players
Cambodian Premier League players
Malaysia Premier League players
Armenian Premier League players
K3 League players
Taiwan Football Premier League players
Hong Kong Premier League players
Long An FC players
Ayeyawady United F.C. players
Kuantan FA players
PDRM FA players
FC Ararat Yerevan players
Gimpo FC players
Phnom Penh Crown FC players
Sham Shui Po SA players
Association football midfielders
Sportspeople from Gangwon Province, South Korea